Boyz 2 is a 2018 Indian Marathi-language comedy drama film directed by Vishal Devrukhkar and written by Hrishikesh Koli. Produced by Everest Entertainment in association with Supreme Motion Pictures and distributed by Eros International. It is second installment to the Boyz franchise. It was theatrically released on 5 October 2018 worldwide.

Plot 
Naru Bondwe, son of college trustee Madan Bondwe, rejoins the college and has a rivalry with Junior. Dharia, Dhungya and Kabir are known for fighting for the rights of juniors. But Kabir now stays away from the hostel because he doesn't want anything else. Seniors are troubled by the 12th board exams. A grade committee will visit the college during the year and tutor Vikram Sabnis, the principal, to end the enmity between juniors and seniors. Chitra A beautiful girl enters the college and Kabir is attracted and goes back to the hostel. The rivalry between juniors and seniors takes a turn for the worst before the grade committee meets. Naru and Kabir, the chosen members of both the teams, must give up their virginity to the girl. And record videos as evidence that failed. The loser has to leave the college.

Cast 

 Sumant Shinde as Kabir
 Parth Bhalerao as Dhungya
 Sayli Patil as Chitra
 Pratik Lad as Dairya
 Onkar Bhojne as Naru Bondwe
 Girish Kulkarni as Madan Bondwe
 Shubhangi Tambale as Swati
 Akshata Padgaonkar as Shalaka 
 Sharvari Jamenis as Radhika 
 Kishori Ambiye as Chandru
 Jaywant Wadkar as Gopi Anna 
 Amitriyaan as Vikram Sabnis 
 Rohit Chavan as Sada
 Soham Kalokhe as Lakha Seth 
 Yatin Karyekar as Principal

 Ritika Shrotri as Grace (uncredited)
 Pallavi Patil as Devika 
 Shilpa Tulaskar as Gayatri Panigrahi (uncredited)

Production 

Boyz 2 is produced by Everest Entertainment and Avdhoot Gupte under the banner of Supreme Motion Pictures and distributed by Eros International. The film has been shot in Pune and some locations of Leh, Ladakh.

Release 
Boyz 2 was scheduled to be theatrically released on 5 October 2018 worldwide.

Soundtrack  

Music is composed by Avdhoot Gupte and songs are recorded by Adarsh Shinde and Rohit Raut.

Reception

Critical reception 
Mayuri Phadnis of The Times of India gave 3 out of 5 and praised the performances but criticised to the story which is predictable. Prajakta Chitnis of Lokmat gave 3 stars and said that the director has taken care not to lean towards vulgarity even though it falls into an adult comedy film. There is nothing wrong with seeing it once.

Box office 
Boyz 2 was released across Maharashtra on 375 screens and grossed  at the box office.

See also 

 Boyz 
 Boyz 3

References

External links 

  
 Boyz 2 at SonyLIV 
 Boyz 2 at Rotten Tomatoes

2018 films
Indian comedy films
Indian drama films